The Mata Redonda Wildlife Refuge is a Wildlife refuge of Costa Rica, part of the Tempisque Conservation Area, which protects tropical forest and wetlands near the Tempisque River and the town of Rosario, Guanacaste.

It consists of seasonal palustrine wetland and contains habitats suitable for over 60 species of resident and migratory water birds, including black-bellied whistling ducks and jabiru.

References

External links
 Mata Redonda Biodiversity Video Documentary at UNED
 Mata Redonda Wildlife Refuge at Costa Rica National Parks

Nature reserves in Costa Rica
Geography of Guanacaste Province